The 1978 NCAA Division I Golf Championship was the 40th annual NCAA-sanctioned golf tournament to determine the individual and team national champions of men's collegiate golf at the University Division level in the United States.

The tournament was held at the Eugene Country Club in Eugene, Oregon.

Oklahoma State won the team championship, the Cowboys' second NCAA title.

David Edwards, also from Oklahoma State, won the individual title.

Individual results

Individual champion
 David Edwards, Oklahoma State

Team results

DC = Defending champions
Debut appearance

References

NCAA Men's Golf Championship
Golf in Oregon
NCAA Golf Championship
NCAA Golf Championship
NCAA Golf Championship